Pal Molnar (born October 1952) is a Hungarian journalist and founder of art awards. The native form of his name is Molnár Pál (Molnár Pál).

Biography
Graduated from the grammar, literature and history faculty of the Teacher Training College in Eger. Journalist since 1977, mainly dealing with economic issues. Author of seventeen books, mostly on national strategic issues.

Worked in print journalism and on television; now president of the Balassi Sword Art Foundation.

In 1997, he founded the Balint Balassi Memorial Sword Award. This literary prize has included an award for translation since 2002. Since then, it has become a prestigious literary award in Hungary. A literary festival and wine competition and Balassi mass have been associated with it since 2005.

Subsequently, he founded fine art, film, journalism and wine awards, in cooperation with Hungarian artists. He organizes the handover ceremonies every year.

Since 1978, member of the Association of Hungarian Journalists.
Since 1992, a member of the Knights of St. George.
Founding member of the Baross Gábor Supporting Economic Society.

His wife is Katalin Szánthó Molnár.

He is the organizer of the Balassi-mass.

Books in Hungary
 Innen az Óperencián, 1998 
 Az Unió kapujában, 1999 
 Ütközet az ezredvégen, 2000 
 A dicsőség pillanatai, 2000
 Dunaferr: bajsikertörténet, 2001
 Európai demokraták, 2001 
 Európai ezredkezdet, 2002 
 Kardtársak, 2002
 Áttörés a médiában, 2005
 Az országépítő, 2006
 A gyökerektől a koronáig, 2007
 A művészet őszinte mély hit, 2008
 A Szent Korona vonzásában, 2011
 A dallá vált szavak, 2014
 Balassi kardtársai, 2016
 Hinni és hihetni egymásnak, 2018
 Vendég a Présházban, 2019
 Rímek szablyaélen, 2020
 Gyöngyös – A Mátra kapuja, 2021

Awards
 Teleki Pál Service Medal
 József Eötvös Press Award 
 Officer's Cross of the Knights of St. George 
 Hungarian Order of Merit, Knight's cross 
 Award Andra Levai

References

External links
Newspaper article about Paul Molnar, founder of the Balassi Sword
Pal Molnar's essay on the history of the Balassi Sword
 http://www.molnarpal.hu
 http://www.balassi.eu
 http://www.preshaz.eu
 11. Hinni és hihetni egymásnak
 Vendég a Présházban

Living people
1952 births
20th-century Hungarian people
20th-century journalists